Jonathan Farwell (born January 9, 1932) is an  American film, television, and Broadway actor. He is best known for his soap opera role as George Rawlins on the CBS daytime drama The Young and the Restless.

Early life
Jonathan Farwell was born in Lansing, Michigan to Arthur Farwell, a composer, and Gertrude Everts Brice, an actress. He married actress Joerle Anne Gaines (professionally known as Jo Farwell) on July 23, 1955. They had two children together: Alison Beatrice Farwell (b. 1958) and Elisabeth Evelyn Farwell (b. 1961).  They separated in 1977, but were never divorced.

Career and personal life
Farwell is perhaps best-known for the role of George Rawlins on the daytime CBS soap opera The Young and the Restless (TV series)

While working on location in a production of Shadowlands in 1994, Jonathan Farwell's first wife died of breast cancer. He met his next wife, Deb Farwell, in a production of The King and I in which they both appeared. They married onstage after a Sunday matinee in 1994.

Filmography

References

External links
 
 

1932 births
Living people
American male soap opera actors
20th-century American male actors
American male film actors